Sonakhali may refer to:

 Sonakhali, Basanti, South 24 Parganas district, West Bengal, India
 Sonakhali, Paschim Medinipur